Walter Ashlin Fairservis (1921 – 1994) was an American archaeologist.

Early life
He was born in Brooklyn, New York, United States, in 1921. His mother, Edith Yeager, was an actress. His wife, Jano, was an artist and illustrator. He received B.A. and M.A. degrees in anthropology from Columbia University and a second M.A. and a Ph.D. from Harvard University.

Bibliography
Some of his notable books are:
 Before the Buddha Came
 The Roots of Ancient India
 Cave Paintings of the Great Hunters
 The Ancient Kingdoms of the Nile and the Doomed Monuments of Nubia
 The Archeology of the Southern Gobi-Mongolia
 The Harappan Civilization and Its Writing: A Model for the Decipherment of the Indus Script
 The Threshold of Civilization: An Experiment in Prehistory
 The Origins of Oriental Civilization

References

External links
 

Harvard University alumni
Columbia Graduate School of Arts and Sciences alumni
Vassar College faculty
People from Brooklyn
1921 births
1994 deaths
20th-century American archaeologists
Historians from New York (state)